Jennifer Jones (born Phylis Lee Isley; March 2, 1919 – December 17, 2009), also known as Jennifer Jones Simon, was an American actress and mental health advocate. Over the course of her career that spanned over five decades, she was nominated for the Oscar five times, including one win for Best Actress, as well as a Golden Globe Award win for Best Actress in a Drama. 

A native of Tulsa, Oklahoma, Jones worked as a model in her youth before transitioning to acting, appearing in two serial films in 1939. Her third role was a lead part as Bernadette Soubirous in The Song of Bernadette (1943), which earned her the Academy Award and Golden Globe for Best Actress. She went on to star in several films that garnered her significant critical acclaim and a further three Academy Award nominations in the mid-1940s, including Since You Went Away (1944), Love Letters (1945), and Duel in the Sun (1946).

In 1949, Jones married film producer David O. Selznick, and appeared as the eponymous Madame Bovary in Vincente Minnelli's 1949 adaptation. She appeared in several films throughout the 1950s, including Ruby Gentry (1952), John Huston's adventure comedy Beat the Devil (1953), and Vittorio De Sica's drama Terminal Station (also 1953). Jones earned her fifth Academy Award nomination for her performance as a Eurasian doctor in Love is a Many-Splendored Thing (1955).

After Selznick's death in 1965, Jones married industrialist Norton Simon and went into semi-retirement. She made her final film appearance in The Towering Inferno (1974).

Jones suffered from mental health problems during her life and survived a 1967 suicide attempt in which she jumped from a cliff in Malibu Beach. After her daughter took her own life in 1976, Jones became profoundly interested in mental health education. In 1980, she founded the Jennifer Jones Simon Foundation for Mental Health and Education. Jones enjoyed a quiet retirement, living for the last six years of her life in Malibu, California where she died of natural causes in 2009, aged 90.

Biography

1919–1939: Early life
Jones was born in Tulsa, Oklahoma, the daughter of Flora Mae (née Suber) and Phillip Ross Isley. Her father was originally from Georgia, while her mother was a native of Sacramento, California. An only child, she was raised Roman Catholic. Her parents, both aspiring stage actors, toured the Midwest in a traveling tent show they owned and operated. Jones accompanied them, performing on occasion as part of the Isley Stock Company.

In 1925, Jones enrolled at Edgemere Public School in Oklahoma City, then attended Monte Cassino, a Catholic girls school and junior college in Tulsa. After graduating, she enrolled as a drama major at Northwestern University in Illinois, where she was a member of Kappa Alpha Theta sorority before transferring to the American Academy of Dramatic Arts in New York City in September, 1937. It was there that she met and fell in love with fellow acting student Robert Walker, a native of Ogden, Utah. They married on January 2, 1939.

Jones and Walker returned to Tulsa for a 13-week radio program arranged by her father, then made their way to Hollywood. She landed two small roles, first in the 1939 John Wayne Western New Frontier, which she filmed in the summer of 1939 for Republic Pictures. Her second project was the serial titled Dick Tracy's G-Men (1939), also for Republic. In both films, she was credited as Phylis Isley. After failing a screen test for Paramount Pictures, she became disenchanted with Hollywood and decided to return to New York City.

1940–1948: Career beginnings
Shortly after Jones married Walker, she gave birth to two sons: Robert Walker Jr. (1940–2019), and Michael Walker (1941–2007). While Walker found steady work in radio programs, Jones worked part-time modeling hats for the Powers Agency, and posing for Harper's Bazaar while looking for acting jobs. When she learned of auditions for the lead role in Rose Franken's hit play Claudia in the summer of 1941, she presented herself to David O. Selznick's New York office but fled in tears after what she thought was a bad reading. However, Selznick had overheard her audition and was impressed enough to have his secretary call her back. Following an interview, she was signed to a seven-year contract.

She was carefully groomed for stardom and given a new name: Jennifer Jones. Director Henry King was impressed by her screen test as Bernadette Soubirous for The Song of Bernadette (1943) and she won the coveted role over hundreds of applicants. In 1944, on her 25th birthday, she won the Academy Award for Best Actress for her performance as Bernadette, her third screen role.

Simultaneous to her rise to prominence for The Song of Bernadette, Jones began an affair with producer Selznick. She separated from Walker in November 1943, co-starred with him in Since You Went Away (1944), and formally divorced him in June 1945. For her performance in Since You Went Away, she was nominated for her second Academy Award, this time for Best Supporting Actress. She earned a third successive Academy Award nomination for her performance opposite Joseph Cotten in the film noir Love Letters (1945).

Jones's dark beauty and initial saintly image (from her first starring role) was a stark contrast three years later when she was cast as a provocative biracial woman in Selznick's controversial Western Duel in the Sun (1946), where she portrayed a Mestiza orphan in Texas who falls in love with an Anglo man (played by Gregory Peck). That year, she starred as the title character in Ernst Lubitsch's romantic comedy Cluny Brown, as a working-class English woman who falls in love just prior to World War II. In 1947, she filmed Portrait of Jennie, a fantasy film released in 1948, based on the novella of the same name by Robert Nathan. It reunited her with co-star Cotten, who portrayed a painter who becomes obsessed with her character, the titular Jennie. It was a commercial failure, grossing only $1.5 million against a $4 million budget.

1949–1964: Marriage to Selznick

Jones married Selznick at sea on July 13, 1949, en route to Europe, after having carried on a relationship for five years. Over the following two decades, she appeared in numerous films he produced, and they established a working relationship. The year they married, Jones starred opposite John Garfield in John Huston's adventure film We Were Strangers. Bosley Crowther of The New York Times felt that Jones's performance was lacking, noting: "There is neither understanding nor passion in the stiff, frigid creature she achieves." She was subsequently cast as the title character of Vincente Minnelli's Madame Bovary (1949), a role originally intended for Lana Turner, which Turner declined. Variety deemed the film "interesting to watch, but hard to feel," though it was noted that "Jones answers to every demand of direction and script." In 1950, Jones starred in the Powell and Pressburger-directed fantasy Gone to Earth as a superstitious gypsy woman in the English countryside.

Jones next starred in William Wyler's drama Carrie (1952), opposite Laurence Olivier. Crowther of The New York Times was unenthused by her performance, writing: "Mr. Olivier gives the film its closest contact with the book, while Miss Jones' soft, seraphic portrait of Carrie takes it furthest away." Also in 1952, she co-starred with Charlton Heston in Ruby Gentry, playing a femme fatale in rural North Carolina who becomes embroiled in a murder conspiracy after marrying a local man. The role was previously offered to Joan Fontaine, who felt she was "unsuited to play backwoods". In their review, Variety deemed the film a "sordid drama [with] neither Jennifer Jones nor Charlton Heston gaining any sympathy in their characters".

In 1953, Jones was cast opposite Montgomery Clift in Italian director Vittorio De Sica's Terminal Station, a Rome-set drama concerning a romance between an American woman and an Italian man. The film, produced by Selznick, had a troubled production history, with Selznick and De Sica disputing over the screenplay and tone of the film. Clift sided with De Sica and reportedly called Selznick "an interfering fuck-face" on set. Aside from the tensions between cast and crew, Jones herself was mourning the recent death of her first husband, Robert Walker, and also missed her two sons, who were staying in Switzerland during production. Terminal Station was screened at the 1953 Cannes Film Festival, and subsequently released in a heavily truncated form in the United States, bearing the title Indiscretion of an American Wife. Also in 1953, Jones re-teamed with director John Huston to star in his film Beat the Devil (1953), an adventure comedy co-starring Humphrey Bogart. The film was a box-office flop and was critically panned upon release, leading even Bogart to distance himself from it. However, it would undergo reevaluation in later years from such critics as Roger Ebert, who included it in his list of "Great Movies" and cited it as the first "camp" film. In August 1954, Jones gave birth to her third child, daughter Mary Jennifer Selznick.

Jones was subsequently cast as Eurasian doctor Han Suyin in the drama Love Is a Many-Splendored Thing (1955), a role that earned her her fifth Academy Award nomination. Crowther of The New York Times lauded her performance as "lovely and intense. Her dark beauty reflects sunshine and sadness." Next, she starred as a schoolteacher in Good Morning, Miss Dove (1955), opposite Robert Stack, followed by a lead role opposite Gregory Peck in The Man in the Gray Flannel Suit, a drama about a World War II veteran.

In 1957, she starred as the poet Elizabeth Barrett Browning in the historical drama The Barretts of Wimpole Street, based on the 1930 play by Rudolf Besier. She followed this with a lead in the Ernest Hemingway adaptation A Farewell to Arms (1957), opposite Rock Hudson. The film received mixed reviews, with Variety noting that "the relationship between Rock Hudson and Jennifer Jones never takes on real dimensions." Jones's next project, another literary adaptation (this time of F. Scott Fitzgerald), came five years later in 1962's Tender Is the Night, in which she portrayed the emotionally troubled Nicole Diver, who observes her husband's falling in love with another woman while in the south of France.

Jones was a registered Republican who supported Dwight Eisenhower's campaign in the 1952 presidential election and was of the Catholic faith.

1965–2009: Later life and activities
Selznick died at age 63 on June 22, 1965, and after his death, Jones semi-retired from acting. Her first role in four years was a lead part in the British drama The Idol (1966), as the mother of an adult son in the Swinging Sixties London, who has an affair with his best friend.  

In 1966, Jones made a rare theatrical appearance in the revival of Clifford Odets' The Country Girl, co-starring Rip Torn, at New York's City Center. On November 9, 1967, the same day her close friend, Charles Bickford died of a blood infection, Jones attempted suicide. Informing her physician of her intention to jump from a cliff overlooking Malibu Beach, she swallowed barbiturates before walking to the base of the cliff, where she was found unconscious amidst the rocky surf. According to biographer Paul Green, it was news of Bickford's death that triggered Jones's suicide attempt. She was hospitalized in a coma from the incident before eventually recovering. She returned to film with Angel, Angel, Down We Go in 1969, about a teenage girl who uses her association with a rock band to manipulate her family.

On May 29, 1971, Jones married her third husband, Norton Simon, a multi-millionaire industrialist, art collector and philanthropist from Portland, Oregon. The wedding took place aboard a tugboat five miles off the English coast and was conducted by Unitarian minister Eirion Phillips. Years before, Simon had attempted to buy the portrait of her that was used in the film Portrait of Jennie; Simon later met Jones at a party hosted by fellow industrialist and art collector Walter Annenberg. Her last big-screen appearance came in the smash-hit disaster film The Towering Inferno (1974), which concerned the burning of a San Francisco skyscraper. Her performance as a doomed guest in the building earned her a Golden Globe nomination for Best Supporting Actress. Early scenes in the film showed paintings lent to the production by the art gallery of Jones' husband Simon.

Two years later, on May 11, 1976, Jones' 21-year-old daughter, Marythen a student at Occidental Collegedied by suicide by jumping from the roof of a 22-floor apartment hotel in downtown Los Angeles. This led to Jones' subsequent interest in mental health issues. In 1979, with husband Simon (whose own son, Robert, died by suicide in 1969), she founded the Jennifer Jones Simon Foundation For Mental Health and Education, which she ran until 2003. One of Jones's primary goals with the Foundation was to de-stigmatize mental illness. "I cringe when I admit I've been suicidal, had mental problems, but why should I?" Jones said in 1980. "I hope we can reeducate the world to see there's no more need for stigma in mental illness than there is for cancer." At the time, she also divulged that she had been a patient of psychotherapy since age 24.

Jones spent the remainder of her life outside of the public eye. Four years before the death of her husband Simon in June 1993, he resigned as President of Norton Simon Museum in Pasadena and Jennifer Jones Simon was appointed chairman of the Board of Trustees, President and Executive Officer. In 1996, she began working with architect Frank Gehry and landscape designer Nancy Goslee Power on renovating the museum and gardens. She remained active as the director of the Norton Simon Museum until 2003, when she was given emerita status.

Death

Jones enjoyed a quiet retirement, living with her eldest child, son Robert Walker Jr., and his family in Malibu for the last six years of her life. Jones's younger son, actor Michael Ross Walker, died from cardiac arrest on December 23, 2007, at age 66.

Jones participated in Gregory Peck's AFI Life Achievement Award ceremony in 1989 and appeared at the 70th (1998) and 75th (2003) Academy Awards as part of the shows' tributes to past Oscar winners. In the last six years of her life, she granted no interviews and rarely appeared in public. She died of natural causes on December 17, 2009, at age 90. She was cremated and her ashes were interred with her second husband in the Selznick private room at the Forest Lawn Memorial Park in Glendale, California.

Minor planet 6249 Jennifer is named in her honor.

Public image
Jones suffered from shyness for much of her life and avoided discussing her past and personal life with journalists. She was also averse to discussing critical analysis of her work. Public discussion of her working relationship with her husband, David O. Selznick, often overshadowed her career. Biographer Paul Green contends that, while Selznick helped facilitate her career and sought roles for her, "Jones excelled because she not only possessed outstanding beauty but she also possessed genuine talent."

Filmography

Awards and nominations 

Academy Awards

Golden Globe Awards

See also 
 List of oldest and youngest Academy Award winners and nominees

References

Sources

Further reading
 
 Carrier, Jeffrey L. / Jennifer Jones: A Bio-Bibliography / Westport, Connecticut / Greenwood Press / 1990 /

External links

 
 
 
 Jennifer Jones - Tribute site
 
 Jennifer Jones - Daily Telegraph obituary
 Encyclopedia of Oklahoma History and Culture - Jones, Jennifer

1919 births
2009 deaths
Actresses from Tulsa, Oklahoma
American film actresses
Actresses from the Golden Age of Hollywood
American Academy of Dramatic Arts alumni
Best Actress Academy Award winners
Best Drama Actress Golden Globe (film) winners
Burials at Forest Lawn Memorial Park (Glendale)
Female models from Oklahoma
Mental health activists
Northwestern University School of Communication alumni
People associated with the Norton Simon Museum
20th-century American actresses
American Roman Catholics
California Republicans
Oklahoma Republicans
21st-century American women